Agriculture in the State of Palestine is a mainstay in the economy of the State of Palestine. The production of agricultural goods supports the population's sustenance needs and fuels Palestine's export economy.  According to the Council for European Palestinian Relations, the agricultural sector formally employs 13.4% of the population and informally employs 90% of the population. Over the past 10 years, unemployment rates in Palestine have increased and the agricultural sector became the most impoverished sector in Palestine. Unemployment rates peaked in 2008 when they reached 41% in Gaza.

According to World Bank Palestinian agriculture suffers  from widespread use of land for nature reserves as well as military and settler use. Because the root of the conflict is with land, the disputes between Israel and Palestine are well-manifested in the agriculture of Palestine.

History
After the Six Day War (1967), Israel's initial occupation of the West Bank led to an encouragement of agriculture. Moshe Dayan actively encouraged its expansion, and as a result agricultural productivity increased on an annual basis by 16%. Permission was extended to expand on land that had hitherto been neglected. A change in policy  occurred in 1976, and by 1979, when the new Likud government was in power, incentives for Palestinian agriculture stopped. The government considered local agriculture a hindrance to its aim of annexing uncultivated land. As a result, water quotas for Palestinian farmers were incrementally reduced, forcing cultivators to leave their lands and seek jobs as day labourers in Israel. The end effect of this decision was that by 1985, the land under Palestinian cultivation in the West Bank decreased by 40%.

The sell of goods from Palestine to Israel became subjected to licensing and further restricted on European markets starting in 1984. Israel was not a commercial producer of olive products so Palestine became a captive market on things Israel needed and restricted on everything else. Palestine had three other problems that restricted farm production. Most farmers were sharecroppers having to split up to 50% with the landlords, going through middlemen to retailers meant a fourteen-fold gain over the farmers poor prices, and there was a lack of marketing.

References 

 
Economy of the State of Palestine